Thomas Marsh Forman (January 4, 1809 – September 27, 1875) was a prominent Confederate politician. He was born Thomas Forman Bryan in Chatham County, Georgia to US Representative Joseph Bryan and Delia Forman Bryan.  In 1846 he changed his name in order to inherit the estate of his maternal grandfather of the same name. 

Forman served in the Georgia state senate in 1847. Forman represented the state in the Provisional Confederate Congress from August 1861 to February 1862, replacing Francis Stebbins Bartow who had been killed at the First Battle of Manassas.

References

External links 
 Thomas Marsh Forman at The Political Graveyard

1809 births
1875 deaths
Deputies and delegates to the Provisional Congress of the Confederate States